Riversleigh World Heritage Area is Australia's most famous fossil location, recognised for the series of well preserved fossils deposited from the Late Oligocene to more recent geological periods. The fossiliferous limestone system is located near the Gregory River in the north-west of Queensland, an environment that was once a very wet rainforest that became more arid as the Gondwanan land masses separated and the Australian continent moved north. The approximately  area has fossil remains of ancient mammals, birds, and reptiles of the Oligocene and Miocene ages, many of which were discovered and are only known from the Riversleigh area; the species that have occurred there are known as the Riversleigh fauna.

The fossils at Riversleigh are unusual because they are found in soft freshwater limestone which has not been compacted. This means the animal remains retain their three-dimensional structure, rather than being partially crushed like in most fossil sites. The area is located within the catchment of the Gregory River.
Many of the fossil sites were crevices and limestone caves created by the action of large amounts of water on the karst formation, creating pitfall traps and feeding spots for predators which periodically and perhaps suddenly became covered and preserved; these conditions are responsible for the large assemblages of fossilised bats whose guano helped to conserve the remains of themselves and others.
 
Fossils were first noted to exist in the area in 1901.  An initial exploration survey was conducted in 1963. Since 1976, the area has been the subject of systemic exploration.  The site was co-listed with the Naracoorte Caves National Park in South Australia as a World Heritage site in 1994, and by itself, it is an extension of the Boodjamulla National Park.

Description 

Fossils at Riversleigh are found in limestone by lime-rich freshwater pools, and in caves, when the ecosystem was evolving from rich rainforest to semiarid grassland community.  Some of the fossils at Riversleigh are 25 million years old.  High concentrations of calcium carbonate have meant the fossils are extremely well preserved. The fossil collection reveals mammalian evolution across more than 20 million years. Fossils have been found in more than 200 individual locations. The fossil record here is significant because it provides evidence on evolution and the distribution of species across Gondwana.

The presence of Riversleigh fauna in the Oligo-Miocene has been classified by four "faunal zones", and used to denote the presence of fossil taxa in these time periods. These may be summarised as
 Faunal Zone A (FZA): Late or Upper Oligocene, 28.4 to 23.03 million years ago
 Faunal Zone B (FZB): Early or Lower Miocene, 23.03 to 15.97 Ma
 Faunal Zone C (FZC): Middle Miocene, 15.97 to 11.608 Ma
 Faunal Zone D (FZD): Late or Upper Miocene, 11.608 to 5.332 Ma

Thirty-five fossil bat species have been identified at the site, which is the richest in the world. Cave deposits have been particularly rich in bat species.

The skull and nearly complete dentition of a 15-million-year-old monotreme, Obdurodon dicksoni, provide a window into the evolution of this characteristically Australian group. Fossil ancestors of the recently extinct thylacine, Thylacinus cynocephalus, have also been identified among Riversleigh's fauna. In 1993, skulls of the koala-like Nimbadon were unearthed in a previously unknown cave in the region.  Researchers estimate that this marsupial first appeared about 15 million years ago and died out about 12 million years ago, perhaps from climate change-induced losses in habitat.  A well-preserved skull of the ancient Nimbacinus dicksoni, an extinct relative of the thylacine, has been used to determine the hunting behavior of the species.

Other fossils have provided evidence of how the koala has evolved in response to Australia's change from predominant rainforest vegetation to drier eucalypt forests. The fossil bird fauna at Riversleigh includes an artamid Kurrartapu johnnguyeni, a fossil sittella, and representatives of various other families of modern birds. Some fossil insects and plants have also been discovered.

The fossil species identified at the sites are collectively known as the Riversleigh fauna.

Research 
Scientific studies are mostly conducted by a group of palaeontologists from the University of New South Wales.  Mike Archer is a paleontologist who has been working at Riversleigh since 1983.  He and his co-workers discovered that diluted acetic acid was the most effective method of extracting fossils. Karen Black, a palaeontologist from UNSW, discovered a new species of extinct koala, at Riversleigh, which was then named after Dick Smith.

See also 

 List of fossil sites
 Agate Fossil Beds National Monument
 Santa Rosa local fauna
 Messel pit
 Laguna del Hunco Formation
 Posidonia Shale

References

Further reading 
 Archer, M. et al. 1991. Riversleigh: the Story of Australia's Inland Rainforests, (Sydney: Reed Books)

External links 
 World heritage listing for Riversleigh
 UNESCO site with information on Riversleigh, Australia
 Information about fossils from Riversleigh, Australian Museum
 The Riversleigh Society supports scientific research at Riversleigh

Oligocene paleontological sites
Miocene paleontological sites
Lagerstätten
North West Queensland
Australian National Heritage List
World Heritage Sites in Queensland
Protected areas of Queensland
Fossil parks in Australia
Fossil trackways
 
Cenozoic paleontological sites of Australia